Hamid Alidoosti (born 12 March 1956) is an Iranian football coach and former player.

Playing career
Alidoosti played for the Iranian club Homa FC for most of his career, and also appeared with FSV Salmrohr in Germany. He was a member of the Iran national team in the late 1970s and early 1980s.

Managerial career
Alidoosti has served as coach for several clubs in Iran, including Homa FC, Paykan FC (2000–2002), and Tractor Sazi (2003–2004). He also coached the Iran U20 national team (2004).

Personal life
His daughter, Taraneh is an actress. His son, Pouyan, died in an accident during the annual Iranian Fire Festival (Chaharshanbe Suri), in March 2005 at the age of 16.

Career statistics

References

1956 births
Living people
People from Tehran
Iranian footballers
Association football midfielders
Iran international footballers
1980 AFC Asian Cup players
1984 AFC Asian Cup players
2. Bundesliga players
Homa F.C. players
FSV Salmrohr players
Keshavarz players
Saipa F.C. players
Iranian football managers
Gahar Zagros F.C. managers
Paykan F.C. managers
Tractor S.C. managers
Iranian expatriate footballers
Iranian expatriate sportspeople in Germany
Expatriate footballers in Germany
Persian Gulf Pro League managers